The Frelinghuysen family is an American political dynasty, primarily based in New Jersey, that first emigrated from The Netherlands in 1720.

History
In 1720, Theodorus Jacobus Frelinghuysen came from The Netherlands to the Raritan Valley in the Province of New Jersey, then a Royal Colony of Great Britain. He was an evangelizing Dutch-Reformed minister during the period of religious fervor known as the Great Awakening.

Politics
Four Frelinghuysens served as United States senators, one of whom, Frederick T., became a Secretary of State under President Chester A. Arthur.

Family tree

Johannes Henrich Frelinghaus m. Anna Margaretha Brüggeman
Theodorus Jacobus Frelinghuysen (ca. 1691 – ca. 1747/49) m. Eva Terhune (ca. 1696 – ca. 1750)
Theodorus Jacobus Frelinghuysen (ca. 1723/24 – ca. 1759/60/1761) m. Elizabeth Symes (1736–1801)
John Frelinghuysen (1727–1754) m. Dina Van Bergh (1825–1807)
Frederick Frelinghuysen (1753–1804) 1st m. Gertrude Schenck (1752/53–1794); 2nd m. Ann Yard (1764–1839)
John Frederick Frelinghuysen (1776–1833) 1st m. Louisa Mercer; 2nd m. Elizabeth Mercereau Van Vechten
Frederick Frelinghuysen (1818–1891) m. Victoria Bowen Sherman (1830–1914)
Joseph Sherman Frelinghuysen Sr. (1869–1948) m. Emily Macy Brewster
Joseph Sherman Frelinghuysen Jr. (1912–2005) m. Emily Lawrance (1911–2004) (daughter of Charles Lawrance)
Barbara Frelinghuysen m. Thomas C. Israel
Joseph S. Frelinghuysen III 
Margaret Lawrance Frelinghuysen m. Paul Alfred Kurzman
Susan Emily Frelinghuysen m. 1981 Robert Dudley van Roijen.
Theodore Frelinghuysen (1787–1862) 1st m. Charlotte Mercer (ca. 1790–1854); 2nd m. Harriet Pumpelly (1815–1876)
Frederick Frelinghuysen (1788–1820) m. Mary Dumont
Frederick Theodore Frelinghuysen (1817–1885) m. Matilda Elizabeth Griswold (1817–1889)
Frederick Frelinghuysen (1848–1924) m. Estelle Burnet Kinney (1868–1931)
Suzy Frelinghuysen (1911–1988) m. George Lovett Kingsland Morris (1905–1975)
George Griswold Frelinghuysen (1851–1936) m. Sarah Linen Ballantine (1885–1940)
Peter H. B. Frelinghuysen (1882–1959) m. Adaline Havemeyer (1884–1963)
Peter Frelinghuysen Jr. (1916–2011) m. Beatrice Sterling Procter (d. 1996)
Peter Frelinghuysen III
Rodney Frelinghuysen (b. 1946) m. Virginia Robinson
Frederick Frelinghuysen
Beatrice Sterling Frelinghuysen m. 1970: Peter Portner van Roijen
Adaline Havemeyer Frelinghuysen m. 1988: Gerald Ogilvie Laing (1936–2011)
Theodore Frelinghuysen (1860–1928) m. 1885: Alice Dudley Coats (1861–1889) m. 1898: Elizabeth Mary Thompson (1871–1967)
Matilda Griswold Frelinghuysen (1864–1926) m. Henry Winthrop Gray (b. 1840)
Sarah Frelinghuysen (b. 1851) m. John J. Davis (b. 1851)
Mathilda Frelinghuysen Davis (1876–1960) m. George Cabot Lodge (1873–1909)
Henry Cabot Lodge Jr. (1902–1985) m. Emily Esther Sears (d. 1992)
John Davis Lodge (1903–1985) m. Francesca Braggiotti (1902–1998)
Helena Lodge (1905 - 1998) m. Edouard de Streel

References

 
American families of Dutch ancestry
Families from New Jersey
Political families of the United States